The PEN/Heim Translation Fund Grants were established in 2003 by PEN America (formerly PEN American Center) following a gift of $730,000 by Michael Henry Heim, a noted literary translator. Heim believed that there was a 'dismayingly low number of literary translations currently appearing in English'. The Grants' purpose is to promote the publication and reception of translated world literature in English. Grants are awarded each year to a select number of literary translators based on quality of translation as well as the originality and importance of the original work. The Fund's mission is to promote the publication and reception of world literature.

Since the first grants were awarded in 2004, the Fund has supported translations of books from over 30 languages.

Many works supported by the Fund are eventually published, and a significant number have won or been shortlisted for major literary awards including the Best Translated Book Award, the Northern California Book Award for Translation, the R. R. Hawkins Award for Outstanding Professional, Reference or Scholarly Book, the National Jewish Book Award for Poetry, National Book Critics Circle Award for Poetry, the Helen and Kurt Wolff Translator's Prize, and Griffin Poetry Prize. Others have received additional support from the Lannan Foundation, or been named one of the New York Public Library's annual list of 25 Books to Remember.

Previously known as the PEN Translation Fund Grants, the awards were renamed in honor of Heim, who insisted on complete anonymity, after his passing in 2012.

List of recipients

2004
The names of ten winners were announced. The voting members of the Advisory Board were Esther Allen, Sara Bershtel, Barbara Epler, Michael Henry Heim, and Eliot Weinberger.
 Andrea Berger for Zsolt Lang's Bestiarium Transylvaniae, vol. I: The Birds of the Air, a novel in Hungarian
 Philip Boehm for Christoph Hein's Settlement, a novel in German (Metropolitan Books, 2008)
 Peter Cole for The Dream of the Poem: Hebrew Poetry from Muslim and Christian Spain, c.950–1492, a collection of poetry in Hebrew (Princeton University Press, 2007)
 Kent Johnson and Forrest Gander for Jaime Sáenz's The Night, a poem in Spanish (Princeton University Press, 2012)
 Idra Novey for Paulo Henriques Britto's The Clean Shirt of It, a collection of poems in Portuguese (BOA Editions, 2007)
 Joonseong (Jason) Park for Song Yong's Diary of a Vagabond, a collection of stories and novellas in Korean (Codhill Press, 2008)
 Kristin Prevallet for Sony Lab'ou Tansi's The Other World: Unpublished Writings, a collection of prose in French
 Timothy Sergay for Aleksandr Pavlovich Chudakov's A Gloom Descends Upon the Ancient Steps, a novel in Russian
 Gerald Turner for Patrik Ouředník's Europeana: A Brief History of the Twentieth Century, a novel in Czech (Dalkey Archive Press, 2005)
 Elizabeth Winslow for Dunya Mikhail's The War Works Hard, a collection of poems in Arabic (New Directions Publishing, 2005)

2005
The names of thirteen winners were announced. The voting members of the Advisory Board were Esther Allen, Sara Bershtel, Barbara Epler, Michael Henry Heim, and Eliot Weinberger.
 Chris Andrews for Roberto Bolaño's Last Evenings on Earth, a collection of stories in Spanish (New Directions Publishing, 2007)
 Rachel Tzvia Back for Leah Goldberg's Selected Poetry and Drama, a collection of poems and plays in Hebrew (The Toby Press, 2005)
 Susan Bernofsky for Jenny Erpenbeck's The Old Child and Other Stories, a collection of stories and novellas in German (New Directions Publishing, 2005)
 Heather Cleary for Olivero Girondo's The Persuasion of Days, a collection of poems in Spanish (New Directions)
 Karen Emmerich for Miltos Sachtouris's Poems (1945-1971), a collection of poems in Greek (Archipelago Books, 2006)
 Jason Grunebaum for Uday Prakash's The Girl with the Golden Parasol, a novel in Hindi (Yale University Press,2013)
 Deborah Hoffman for The Littlest Enemies: Children in the Shadow of the Gulag, edited by Semen Samuilovich Vilenskii, a volume of memoirs, diaries, and letters in Russian by the children of Soviet enemies of the people (Slavica Publishers, 2007)
 Elizabeth Macklin for Kirmen Uribe's Meanwhile Take My Hand: Poems, a collection of poems in Basque (Graywolf Press, 2007)
 Susanna Nied for Inger Christensen's Butterfly Valley, a collection of poems in Danish (New Directions Publishing, 2004)
 Laima Sruoginis for My Voice Betrays Me, a collection of oral narratives in Lithuanian by street children, collected by Vanda Juknaite (East European Monographs, 2007)
 George Szirtes for László Krasznahorkai's War and War, a novel in Hungarian (New Directions Publishing, 2006)
 Paul Vincent for Louis Paul Boon's Summer in Termuren, a novel in Dutch (Dalkey Archive Press, 2006)
 Susan Wilf for Kang Zhengguo's Confessions: An Innocent Life in Communist China, a memoir in Chinese (W. W. Norton & Company, 2007)

2006
The names of nine winners were announced. The voting members of the Advisory Board were Esther Allen, Sara Bershtel, Barbara Epler, Michael Henry Heim, Michael F. Moore, Richard Sieburth, and Eliot Weinberger.
 Johannes Goransson for Henry Parland's Collected Poems, a collection of poems in Swedish (Ugly Duckling, 2007)
 Victoria Haggblom for Elisabeth Rynell's To Mervas, a novel in Swedish (Archipelago, 2010)
 Nicky Harman for Han Dong's Banished!, a novel in Chinese (University of Hawaii Press, 2009)
 Ann L. Huss for Ge Fei's Beauty (Renmian taohua), a novel in Chinese
Sawako Nakayasu for Takashi Hiraide's For the Fighting Spirit of the Walnut, a poem in Japanese (New Directions Publishing, 2008)
Tegan Raleigh for Assia Djebar's The Tongue’s Blood Does Not Run Dry: Algerian Stories, a collection of stories in French (Seven Stories Press, 2006)
 Constantine Rusanov for Tomas Venclova's The Junction, a collection of poems in Lithuanian (Bloodaxe, 2008)
 Stepan S. Simek for Petr Zelenka's Theremin and Iva Volankova's Three Sisters 2002.CZ, two plays in Czech
 Alan Trei and Inna Feldbach for A. H. Tammsaare's Robber’s Rise (Book 1 of the Truth and Justice pentalogy), a novel in Estonian

2007
The names of ten winners were announced. The voting members of the Advisory Board were Esther Allen, Sara Bershtel, Barbara Epler, Michael Henry Heim, Michael F. Moore, Richard Sieburth, and Eliot Weinberger.
 Susan Bernofsky for Robert Walser's The Assistant, a novel in German (New Directions Publishing, 2007)
 Jennifer Hayashida for Fredrik Nyberg's Clockwork and Flowers: Explanations and Poems, a collection of poems in Swedish 
Wen Huang for Yang Xianhui's The Woman from Shanghai, a collection of stories in Chinese (Pantheon, 2010)
 Ha-yun Jung for Shin Kyung-sook's A Lone Room, a novel in Korean (Pegasus Books, 2015)
Sara Khalili for Shahriar Mandanipour's Seasons of Purgatory, a collection of stories in Persian
 Paul Olchváry for Ferenc Barnás's The Ninth, a novel in Hungarian (Northwestern University Press, 2009)
 Bill Porter (a.k.a. Red Pine) for Wei Yingwu's In Such Hard Times, a collection of poems in Chinese (Copper Canyon Press, 2009)
Katherine Silver for Horacio Castellanos Moya's Senselessness, a novel in Spanish (New Directions Publishing, 2008)
 Christopher Southward for Hitonari Tsuji's Acacia, a collection of stories in Japanese (excerpted in Brooklyn Rail, 2008
 Alyson Waters for Albert Cossery's A Splendid Conspiracy, a novel in French (New Directions Publishing, 2010)

2008
The names of eight winners were announced.

The voting members of the Advisory Board were Sara Bershtel, Edwin Frank, Michael Henry Heim, Michael F. Moore, Richard Sieburth and Jeffrey Yang, and Esther Allen served as the non-voting Chair.
 Bernard Adams for Dezső Kosztolányi's Kornél Esti, a collection of stories in Hungarian (New Directions Publishing, 2011)
 Jeffrey Angles for Mutsuo Takahashi's Twelve Perspectives, a memoir in Japanese (University of Minnesota Press, 2012)
 Andrea Lingenfelter for Anni Baobei's Padma, a novel in Chinese
Jessica Moore for Jean-François Beauchemin's Turkana Boy, a novel in French (Talonbooks, 2012)
 Sean Redmond for Felix Fabri's Another Holy Land: Felix Fabri’s Voyage to Medieval Egypt, a memoir in Latin (American University in Cairo Press, 2010)
Mira Rosenthal for Tomasz Różycki's Colonies, a collection of poems in Polish (Zephyr Press, 2012)
 Damion Searls for Nescio's Amsterdam Stories, a collection of stories in Dutch (NYRB Classics, 2012)

2009
The names of eleven winners were announced.

The voting members of the Advisory Board were Sara Bershtel, Edwin Frank, Michael Henry Heim, Michael F. Moore, Richard Sieburth, and Jeffrey Yang, and Esther Allen served as the non-voting Chair.
Eric Abrahamsen for Wang Xiaobo's My Spiritual Homeland, a collection of essays in Chinese
 Mee Chang for Oh Jung-hee's Garden of Youth, a collection of stories in Korean
Robyn Creswell for Abdelfattah Kilito's The Clash of Images, a novel in French (New Directions Publishing, 2010)
Brett Foster for Cecco Angiolieri's Elemental Rebel: The Rime of Cecco Angiolieri, a collection of poems in Italian ([excerpted on Able Muse, 2014)
 G.M. Goshgarian for Hagop Oshagan's The Remnants, a novel in Armenian (Gomidas Institute, 2013)
Tess Lewis for Alois Hotschnig's Maybe This Time, a novel in German (Peirene Press, 2011)
 Fayre Makeig for Hushang Ebtehaj's 'Mourning, a collection of poems in Persian
 Arvind Krishna Mehrotra for Kabir's Songs of Kabir, a collection of poems in Hindi (NYRB Classics, 2011)
Frederika Randall for Luigi Meneghello's Deliver Us from Evil, a memoir in Italian (Northwestern University Press, 2011)
Daniel Shapiro for Roberto Ransom's Missing Persons, Animals and Artists, a collection of stories in Spanish (Swan Isle Press, 2018)
Chantal Wright for Tzveta Sofronieva's A Hand Full of Water, a collection of poems in German (White Pine Press, 2012)

2010
The names of eleven winners were announced.

The voting members of the Advisory Board were Esther Allen, David Bellos, Susan Bernofsky, Edwin Frank, Michael F. Moore, and Jeffrey Yang.
 Daniel Brunet for Dea Loher's The Last Fire, a play in German
 Alexander Dawe for Ahmet Hamdi Tanpınar's collection of stories in Turkish
 Peter Golub for Linor Goralik's collection of flash fiction in Russian
 Piotr Gwiazda for Grzegorz Wroblewski's Kopenhaga, a collection of poems in Polish (Zephyr Press)
 David Hull for Mao Dun's Waverings, a novel in Chinese (Chinese University of Hong Kong, 2014)
 Akinloye A. Ojo for Akinwunmi Isola's Afaimo and Other Poems, a collection of poems in Yorùbá
 Angela Rodel for Georgi Tenev's Holy Light, a collection of stories in Bulgarian
 Margo Rosen for Anatoly Naiman's Poetry and Untruth, a novel in Russian
 Chip Rossetti for Mohamad Makhzangi's Animals in Our Days, a collection of stories in Arabic ([excerpted in Words Without Borders, 2011)
 Bilal Tanweer for Mohammad Khalid Akhtar's Love in Chikiwara (and Other Such Adventures), a novel in Urdu (Pan Macmillan India, 2016)
Diane Thiel for Eugenia Fakinou's The Great Green, a novel in Greek

2011
The names of eleven winners were announced. The voting members of the Advisory Board were David Bellos, Susan Bernofsky, Edwin Frank, Michael Reynolds, Natasha Wimmer, and Jeffrey Yang, and Michael F. Moore served as the non-voting Chair.
 Amiri Ayanna for The St. Katharinental Sister Book: Lives of the Sisters of the Dominican Convent at Diessenhofen, a sacred text in German (excerpted in Asymptote, 2016)
 Neil Blackadder for Lukas Bärfuss's 'The Test (Good Simon Korach), a play in German
 Clarissa Botsford for Elvira Dones's Sworn Virgin, a novel in Italian (And Other Stories, 2014)
 Steve Bradbury for Hsia Yü's Salsa, a collection of poems in Chinese (Zephyr Press, 2014)
Annmarie S. Drury for Euphrase Kezilahabi's collection of poems in Swahili (Michigan State University Press, 2015)
 Diane Nemec Ignashev for Viktor Martinovich's Paranoia, a novel in Russian (Northwestern University Press, 2013)
 Chenxin Jiang for Ji Xianlin's Memories of the Cowshed, a memoir in Chinese (New York Review Books, 2016)
 Hilary B. Kaplan for Angélica Freitas's Rilke Shake, a collection of poems in Portuguese (Phoneme, 2016). 2016 National Translation Award winner. 2016 Best Translated Book Award winner.
 Catherine Schelbert for Hugo Ball's Flametti, or the Dandyism of the Poor, a novel in German (Wakefield Press, 2014)
 Joel Streicker for Samanta Schweblin's Birds in the Mouth, a collection of stories in Spanish
 Sarah L. Thomas for Mar Goméz Glez's Turnaround, a novel in Spanish (excerpted in Words Without Borders, 2012)

2012
The names of thirteen winners were announced.
 The voting members of the Advisory Board were Susan Bernofsky, Barbara Epler, Edwin Frank, Michael Reynolds, Richard Sieburth, Eliot Weinberger, and Natasha Wimmer, and Michael F. Moore served as the non-voting Chair.
 Bernard Adams for Andrea Tompa's A Hóhér Háza (The Hangman’s House), a novel in Hungarian
 Alexander Booth for Lutz Seiler's Im Felderlatein (In Latin Fields), a collection of poems in German
 Brent Edwards for Michel Leiris's L’Afrique fantome (Phantom Africa), an ethnography in French (Seagull Books)
 Joshua Daniel Edwin for Dagmara Kraus's cumbering (gloomerang), a collection of poems in German
 Musharraf Ali Farooqi for Muhammad Husain Jah and Ahmed Husain Qamar's Hoshruba: The Prisoner of Batin, an epic in Urdu (Random House India)
 Deborah Garfinkle for Pavel Šrut's Worm-Eaten Time: Poems from a Life Under Normalization, a collection of poems in Czech
 Hillary Gulley for Marcelo Cohen's El fin de lo mismo (The End of the Same), a novel in Spanish
 Bonnie Huie for Qiu Miaojin's Notes of a Crocodile, a novel in Chinese (NYRB Classics) 
 Jacquelyn Pope for Hester Knibbe's Hungerpots, a collection of poems in Dutch
 Matt Reeck and Aftab Ahmad for Mushtaq Ahmad Yusufi's Mirages of the Mind, a novel in Urdu
 Carrie Reed for Duan Chengshi's Youyang zazu (Miscellaneous Morsels from Youyang), a collection of prose in Chinese
 Nathanaël for Hervé Guibert's The Mausoleum of Lovers, a set of journals in French (Nightboat Books)

For a NYSCA grant, the Fund also nominated Ana Božičević for Zvonko Karanović's It Was Easy to Set the Snow on Fire.

2013
The names of thirteen winners were announced. The voting members of the Advisory Board were Susan Bernofsky, Barbara Epler, Richard Sieburth, Lauren Wein, Eliot Weinberger, Natasha Wimmer, and Matvei Yankelvich, and Michael F. Moore served as the non-voting Chair.
 Daniel Borzutzky for Raúl Zurita's El País de Tablas (The Country of Planks), a collection of Spanish poems (Action Books,)
 Isabel Cole for Franz Fühmann's At the Burning Abyss,  (Seagull Books)
 Sean Cotter for Mateiu Caragiale's Rakes of the Old Court
 Chloe Garcia Roberts for Li Shangyin's Escalating Derangements of My Contemporaries, (New Directions Publishing)
 Edward Gauvin for Jean Ferry's The Conductor and Other Tales, (Wakefield Press)
 Eleanor Goodman for Wang Xiaoni’s Something Crosses My Mind, (Zephyr Press)
 Marilyn Hacker for Jean-Paul de Dadelsen's The Bridges of Budapest
 Elizabeth Harris for Antonio Tabucchi's Tristano Dies, (Archipelago Books)
 Jennifer Hayashida for Athena Farrokhzad's Vitsvit
 Eugene Ostashevsky and Daniel Mellis for Vasily Kamensky's Tango with Cows
 Jeremy Tiang for Zou Jingzhi's Nine Buildings
 Annie Tucker for Eka Kurniawan's Beauty Is A Wound (New Directions)
 Lara Vergnaud for Zahia Rahmani's France, récit d’une enfance (France, Story of Childhood)

For a NYSCA grant, the Fund also nominated Iza Wojciechowska for Anna Piwkowska's Farbiarka (The Dye Girl).

2014
The names of fifteen winners were announced. The voting members of the Advisory Board were Esther Allen, Barbara Epler, Sara Khalili, Michael F. Moore, Lauren Wein, and Lorin Stein.
 Kurt Beals for Regina Ullmann's The Country Road (New Directions Publishing)
 Eric M.B. Becker for Mia Couto's Selected Stories
 David Burnett for Johannes Urzidil's The American Stories
 Janet Hong for Han Yujoo's The Impossible Fairytale
 Paul Hoover for María Baranda's Nightmare Running on a Meadow of Absolute Light
 Andrea G. Labinger for Guillermo Saccomanno's Gesell Dome (Open Letter)
 Sergey Levchin for Chris Marker's Commentaires
 Zachary Ludington for Agustín Fernández Mallo's Pixel Flesh (Carne de Píxel)
 J. Bret Maney for Guillermo Cotto-Thorner's Manhattan Tropics
 Philip Metres and Dimitri Psurtsev for Arseny Tarkovsky's I Burned at the Feast (Cleveland State University Poetry Center)
 Sayuri Okamoto for Dear Monster: the Naked Poetry of Gozo Yoshimasu
 Benjamin Paloff for Richard Weiner's The Game for Real, (Two Lines Press)
 Miranda Richmond Mouillot for Romain Gary's The Kites
 Thom Satterlee for ‘’New and Selected Poetry of Per Aage Brandt Sholeh Wolpé for Farid ud-Din Attar’s The Conference of the Birds (Man-tiq ut-tayr)For NYSCA grants, the Fund nominated Edna McCown for Ursula Krechel's Shanghai, far from where and Yvette Siegert for Alejandra Pizarnik's Diana's Tree (Ugly Duckling Presse).

2015
The names of sixteen winners were announced. The voting members of the Advisory Board were Esther Allen, Mitzi Angel, Peter Blackstock, Howard Goldblatt, Sara Khalili, Michael F. Moore, Declan Spring, and Alex Zucker.

 Allison M. Charette for Naivo's Beyond the Rice Fields (Restless Books)
 Jennifer Croft for Olga Tokarczuk's The Books of Jacob (Biblioasis)
 Stephan Delbos and Tereza Novická for Vítězslav Nezval's The Absolute Gravedigger.(Twisted Spoon Press)
 Amanda DeMarco for Gaston de Pawlowski's New Inventions and the Latest Innovations.(Wakefield Press)
 Adriana X. Jacobs for Vaan Nguyen's The Truffle Eye Roy Kesey for Aurora Venturini's The Cousins Lee Klein for Horacio Castellanos Moya's Revulsion: Thomas Bernhard in San Salvador. (New Directions Publishing)
 Dong Li for Song Lin's The Gleaner Song Meg Matich for Magnús Sigurðsson's Cold Moons Jacob Moe for Maria Mitsora's Part Time Dragons. (Yale University Press)
 Rajiv Mohabir for Lalbihari Sharma's Holi Songs of Demerara. Takami Nieda for Kazuki Kaneshiro's GO Zoë Perry for Veronica Stigger's Opisanie Świata Will Schutt for The Selected Poems of Edoardo Sanguineti. Sophie Seita for Uljana Wolf's Subsisters: Selected Poems(Belladonna)
 Simon Wickhamsmith for Tseveendorjin Oidov's The End of the Dark Era.2016
The names of fourteen winners were announced. The voting members of the Advisory Board were Esther Allen, Peter Blackstock, Sara Khalili, Tynan Kogane, Allison Markin Powell, Antonio Romani, Chip Rossetti, and Alex Zucker. Each winner was given $3,670.00.

 Gabriel Amor for Ana Azourmanian's Juana I, a poem cycle in Spanish.
 Ellen Cassedy for Yenta Mash’s On the Landing: Selected Stories, a Yiddish collection of stories.
 Chris Clarke for Marcel Schwob’s Imaginary Lives, a French short-story collection. (Forthcoming from Wakefield Press)
 Sharon Dolin for Gemma Gorga's Book of Minutes, a Catalan prose poetry collection.
 Kaiama L. Glover for René Depestre’s Hadriana in All My Dreams, a French novel. (Akashic Books)
 Anita Gopalan for Geet Chaturvedi’s Simsim, a Hindi novella.
 Amanda Lee Koe for Su Qing’s Ten Years of Marriage, a Chinese novel.
 Karen Leeder for Ulrika Almut Sandig's Thick of It, a German poetry collection.
 Rachel McNicholl for Anita Augustin's Operation Hinterland: Tales from the Silver Scrapheap, a German novel.
 Alicia Maria Meier for Marta Carnicero Hernanz's The Sky According to Google, a Catalan novel.
 Emma Ramadan for Ahmed Bouanani's Les Persiennes, a French prose poetry book.
 Corine Tachtiris for Alexandra Berková’s Dark Love, a Czech novel.
 Russell Scott Valentino for Miljenko Jergović’s Kin, a Bosnian-Croatian-Serbian family saga.. (Archipelago)
 Jeffrey Zuckerman for The Complete Stories of Hervé Guibert, a French collection of short fictions.

 2017 
The names of fifteen winners were announced. The voting members of the Advisory Board were Tyan Kogane, Edna McCrown, Fiona McCrae, Canaan Morse, Idra Novey, Allison Markin Powell, Antonio Romani, Chip Rossetti, Shabham Nadiya, and Ross Ufberg.
 Nick Admussen for Floral Mutter by YA Shi (哑石) translated from the Chinese
 Polly Barton for The Cowards Who Looked to the Sky by Misumi Kubo, translated from the Japanese
 Elizabeth Bryer for The Palimpsests by Aleksandra Lun, translated from the Spanish
 Vitaly Chernetsky for Felix Austria by Sophia Andrukhovych, translated from the Ukrainian 
 Iain Galbraith for Raoul Schrott: Selected Poems, translated from the German
 Michelle Gil-Montero for Edinburgh Notebook by Valerie Mejer Caso, translated from the Spanish
 Sophie Hughes for The Remainder by Alia Trabucco Zerán, translated from the Spanish 
 Elisabeth Jaquette for Thirteen Months of Sunrises by Rania Mamoun, translated from the Arabic 
 Kira Josefsson for The Arab by Pooneh Rohi, translated from the Swedish 
  Adam Morris for I Didn’t Talk by Beatriz Bracher, translated from the Portuguese
 Kaitlin Rees for A Parade by Nhã Thuyên, translated from the Vietnamese 
 Dayla Rogers for Wûf by Kemal Varol, translated from the Turkish
 Christopher Tamigi for In Your Name by Mauro Covacich, translated from the Italian 
 Manjushree Thapa  for There’s a Carnival Today by Indra Bahadur Rai, translated from the Nepali
 Joyce Zonana for This Land That Is Like You by Tobie Nathan, translated from the French

2018
The names of twelve winners were announced. The voting members of the Advisory Board were John Balcom, Peter Constantine, Tynan Kogane, Allison Markin Powell, Fiona McCrae, Mary Ann Newman, Antonio Romani, Chip Rossetti, Ross Ufberg, Natasha Wimmer, and Board Chair Samantha Schnee. 

 Janine Beichman for The Essential Yosano Akiko: The Ripening Years by Yosani Akiko, translated from Japanese
 Alexander Dickow for Neverending Quest for the Other Shore: An Epic in Three Cantos by Sylvie Kandé, translated from French
 Emily Drumstra for Revolt Against the Sun by Nazik al-Malaika, translated from Arabic
 Lindy Falk van Rooyen for Hope by Mich Vraa, translated from Danish
 Bruce Fulton and Ju-Chan Fulton for One Left by Sum Kim, translated from Korean
 Michael Gluck for Matisse by Alexander Ilichevsky, translated from Russian
 Mariam Rahmani for Don't Worry by Mahsa Mohebali, translated from Farsi
 Aaron Robertson for Beyond Babylon by Igiaba Scego, translated from Italian
 Julia Sanchez for Slash and Burn by Claudia Hernández, translated from Spanish
 Jamie Lee Searle for Winter's Garden by Valerie Fritsch, translated from German
 Brian Sneeden for Rhapsodia by Phoebe Giannisi, translated from Greek
 Ri J. Turner for Chaim Gravitzer by Fischel Schneerson, translated from Yiddish
 Jeanne Bonner for A Walk in the Shadows by Mariateresa Di Lascia, translated from Italian (Winner of The PEN Grant for the English Translation of Italian Literature)

2019

 Bruna Dantas Lobato for Moldy Strawberries: Stories by Caio Fernando Abreu, translated from Portuguese
 Stephen Epstein for The Wandering: Choose Your Own Red Shoes Adventure by Intan Paramaditha, translated from Indonesian
 Misha Hoekstra for New Passengers by Tine Høeg, translated from Danish
 Lucas Klein for Chinese of Words as Grains: New and Selected Poems of Duo Duo, translated from Chinese
 Simon Leser for Of Our Wounded Brothers by Joseph Andras, translated from French
 Emma Lloyd for Of Pearls and Scars by Pedro Lemebel, translated from Spanish
 Ottilie Mulzet for Swedish (2nd, revised edition) by Gábor Schein, translated from Hungarian
 Catherine Nelson for Tea Rooms: Working Women by Luisa Carnés, translated from Spanish
 Julia Powers for Selected Poems of Hilda Hilst, translated from Portuguese 
 Lara Vergnaud for The Ardent Swarm by Yamen Manai, translated from French
 Hope Campbell Gustafson for The Commander of the River by Ubah Cristina Ali Farah, translated from Italian

2020
Winners in 2020 were:
 Curtis Bauer for Home Reading Service by Fabio Morábito, translated from Spanish
 Fiona Bell for The Russian Of Stories by Natalia Meshchaninova, translated from Russian
 Kevin Gerry Dunn for Easy Reading by Cristina García Morales, translated from Spanish
 Dawn Fulton for Cajou by Michèle Lacrosil, translated from French
 Anton Hur for Cursed Bunny by Bora Chung, translated from Korean
 Yarri Kamara for So Distant From My Life by Monique Ilboudo, translated from French
 Johnny Lorenz for Notebook Of Return by Edimilson De Almeida Pereira, translated from Portuguese
 Shabnam Nadiya for The Meat Market And Other Stories by Mashiul Alam, translated from Bengali
 Quyen Nguyen Hoang for Chronicles Of A Village by Hien Thanh Nguyen, translated from Vietnamese
 Jacob Rogers for Extraordinary by Antón Lopo, translated from Galician
 Minna Zallman Proctor for The Renegade: Natalia Ginzburg, Her Life And Writing by Sandra Petrignani, translated from Italian (Winner of The PEN Grant for the English Translation of Italian Literature)

2021
10 grants were made in 2021:
 Natascha Bruce for Owlish and the Music-Box Ballerina by Dorothy Tse, translated from the Chinese 
 Rohan Chhetri for The Dust Draws Its Face on the Wind: Essential Poems by Avinash Shrestha, translated from the Nepali 
Rachael Daum for Lusitania by Dejan Atanacković, translated from the  Serbian
Katharine Halls for Things That Can't Be Fixed by Haytham El-Wardany, translated from the Arabic 
Banibrata Mahanta for Labanyadevi by Kusum Khemani, translated from the  Hindi
Adrian Minckley for The Whore by Márcia Barbieri, translated from the  Portuguese
Lara Norgaard for 24 Hours with Gaspar by Sabda Armandio, translated from the Indonesian 
Ekaterina Petrova for Traveling in the Direction of the Shadow by Iana Boukova, translated from the Bulgarian 
Jake Syersak for I, Caustic by Mohammed Khaïr-Eddine, translated from the French 
Vala Thorodds for Swanfolk by Kristín Ómarsdóttir, translated from the Icelandic

2022
Winners in 2022 were:

Bernard Capinpin for A Brief Investigation to a Long Melancholia by Edel Garcellano, translated from the Filipino
Rajnesh Chakrapani and Anca Roncea for Detachment by Mina Decu, translated from the Romanian
Danielle Legros Georges for Balafres by Marie-Célie Agnant, translated from the French
Ryan Greene for The Green Sun by Yaxkin Melchy Ramos, translated from the Spanish
May Huang for Young Gods by Chiou Charng-Ting, translated from the Chinese
Mirgul Kali for To Hell with Poets by Baqytgul Sarmekova, translated from the Kazakh
Adam Mahler for Closed House/A Dau(gh)ter in His Stead by Luz Pichel, translated from the Castrapo
Jay Rubin for Rosa Mistika by Euphrase Kezilahabi, translated from the Swahili
Yasmine Seale for If You See Them Fall to Earth by Abd al-Ghani al-Nabulsi, translated from the Arabic
Tim Cummins for We Will Take Our Revenge by Paolo Nori, translated from the Italian (Winner of The PEN Grant for the English Translation of Italian Literature)

2023
Winners in 2023 were:
:
Kristine Muslim for Book of the Damned by Amado Anthony G. Mendoza III, translated from the Filipino
Mark Tardi for Dogs of Smaller Breeds by Olga Hund, translated from the Polish
Noor Habib and Zara Khadeeja Majoka for Oblivion and Eternity Within Me by Miraji, translated from the Urdu
Joaquin Gavilano for The Hostage by Gabriel Mamani Magne, translated from the Spanish
Stoyan Tchaprazov for The Misunderstood Civilization by Dobri Voinikov, translated from the Bulgarian
Margaret Litvin for The Russian Quarter by Khalil Alrez, translated from the Arabic
Stine An for Today’s Morning Vocabulary by Yoo Heekyung, translated from the Korean
Richard Prins for Walenisi by Katama Mkangi, translated from the Swahili
Priyamvada Ramkumar for White Elephant by B. Jeyamohan, translated from the Tamil
Caroline Froh for Words of Resistance by Mariella Mehr, translated from the German
Isabella Corletto for Fathers'' by Giorgia Tribuiani, translated from the Italian (Winner of The PEN Grant for the English Translation of Italian Literature)

References

External links
 PEN/Heim Translation Fund Grants (official website)

Translation awards
PEN America awards
Awards established in 2003
2003 establishments in the United States